Allentown, Pennsylvania may refer to:
 Allentown, Pennsylvania, a city in Lehigh County, Pennsylvania
Allentown metropolitan area, containing the city of Allentown
 Allentown, Allegheny County, Pennsylvania, an unrelated neighborhood in the city of Pittsburgh

See also
 Allentown (disambiguation)
 Allen Township, Pennsylvania (disambiguation)